Louis-Joseph Thisdel (May 16, 1886 – February 9, 1943) was a politician in the Quebec, Canada.  He served as Member of the Legislative Assembly.

Early life

He was born on May 16, 1886, in Louiseville, Mauricie.

City politics

He was on the city council in Louiseville from 1918 to 1922 and mayor of that town from 1923 to 1930.

Provincial politics

Thisdel won a by-election in 1930 and became the Liberal Member of the legislature, representing the provincial district of Maskinongé.  He was re-elected in 1931 and 1935.

In 1936 he was defeated by Union Nationale candidate Joseph-Napoléon Caron.  In 1939 though, he ran again and won his seat back.

He served as Minister without Portfolio in Premier Adélard Godbout's Cabinet.

Death

He died in office on February 9, 1943, in Louiseville.  He was succeeded by Germain Caron who was elected in 1944.

References

1886 births
1943 deaths
Mayors of places in Quebec
People from Mauricie
Quebec Liberal Party MNAs
French Quebecers